Têtes des Vautisse is a mountain in the French Alps.

External links
 Article 

Mountains of Hautes-Alpes
Mountains of the Alps
Alpine three-thousanders